Anwyl of Tywyn (Anwyl pronounced ) are a Welsh family who claim a patrilinear descent from Owain Gwynedd, King of Gwynedd from 1137 to 1170 and a scion of the royal House of Aberffraw. The family motto is: Eryr eryrod Eryri, which translates as "The Eagle of the Eagles of Snowdonia. The family lives in Gwynedd and speak Welsh.

The name Anwyl means "beloved", "dear", or "loved one" in English.

Descent from Owain Gwynedd (died 1170) to James ap Maredudd (died c.1402)

 Owain Gwynedd, Prince of Gwynedd (d. November 1170) = Cristina ferch Gronw ap Owain ap Edwin
 Rhodri ab Owain Gwynedd, Lord of Anglesey (d.1195 [sixth son of Owain]) = Annest ferch Rhys ap Gruffudd

In the book Annals and antiquities of the counties and county families of Wales; Section V (Old and Extinct Families of Merionethshire) (published 1872) by Thomas Nicholas the descendants of Rhodri ab Owain are described;

"Thomas (ap Rhodri ap Owain), Lord of Rhiw Llwyd, married Agnes, daughter of Einion ap Seissyllt, Lord of Mathafarn, widow of Owain Brogyntyn, Lord of Edeirnion. His descendants, Lords of Rhiw Llwyd, were successively Caradog, Gruffydd, Dafydd, and Hywel, who married Efa, daughter of Ifan ap Howel ap Meredydd of Ystumcegid, of the line of Collwyn
ap Tangno, founder of the fifth noble tribe of Wales."

 Tomas ap Rhodri ab Owain Gwynedd = Annest ferch Einion ap Seisyllt
 Caradog ap Tomas = Efa ferch Gwyn ap Gruffudd ap Beli
 Gruffudd ap Caradog = Lleuca ferch Llywarch Fychan ap Llywarch
 Dafydd ap Gruffudd of Rhos = Efa ferch Gruffudd Fychan
 Hywel ap Dafydd = Efa ferch Evan ap Hywel ap Maredudd

 Maredudd ap Hywel (d. after 1353) = Morfydd verch Ieuan ap Dafydd ap Trahaern Goch. He had issue two sons;

 Robert ap Maredudd
 James (Evan) ap Maredudd

According to Philip Yorke in his book The Royal Tribes of Wales (published 1799);

"The father of James and Robert was Maredudd ab Hywel ab Dafydd ab Gruffudd ab Thomas ab Rodri, Lord of Anglesey, ab Owain Gwynedd, as is evident by the Extent of North Wales, in the twenty-sixth of Edward the Third. During Robert ab Maredudd's time, the inheritance, which descended to him and his brother James, was not parted after the custom of the country, by gavelkind, but James being married -enjoyed both houses, Cefn y fan and Cesail Gyfarch. From Robert, who did not marry till near eighty, descended the houses of Gwydir, Cesail Gyfarch, and Hafod Lwyfog; and Sir John the historian, his descendant, says, he was the elder brother; from James ab Maredudd, who was Constable of Cricieth, the families of Rhiwaedog, Clenenneu, Ystumcegid, Brynkir and Park."

The family who resided at Parc came to be known as the Anwyl of Park family, with Anwyl taking various spellings over the years. The sons of Maredudd ap Hywel, Robert and James, took opposing sides during the last war of Welsh independence led by Owain Glyndŵr between 1400 and c.1412. Robert, the elder brother and the ancestor of the Wynn of Gwydir family sided with Glyndŵr but survived the war receiving a Royal Pardon from Henry IV and later by his son Henry V. James, the younger son, opposed Glyndŵr. According to Philip Yorke he had matched his son Maredudd ab James with the daughter of Einion ab Ithel, who belonged to the House of Lancaster. James ab Maredudd held steadfastly to that house when Owain Glyndŵr rebelled so that in the time of that war he had the charge of Caernarfon town and held it for the Crown of England. In revenge for this Owain Glyndŵr burned his two houses; Cefn y fan or Ystumcegid and Cesail Gyfarch. James ap Maredudd was killed during the continuance of this war at Caernarfon and his body evacuated by sea to be buried at Penmorfa.

Descent from Jeuan ap Maredudd (died c.1402) to William Lewis Annwill (died 1642)

 Ieuan (James) ap Maredudd (died c.1402) = Lucy verch Hywel Sele, Lord of Nannau
 Maredudd ab Ieuan (James) (f.1420) = Angharad verch Einion ab Ithel sef aeres Rhiwaedog
 Siôn (John) ap Maredudd (f.1485) = Gwenhwyvir ferch Goronwy ab Ieuan o Gollwyn

According to Philip Yorke;

"To John ab Maredudd his kindred and friends cleaved steadfastly, like courageous men: so then it began to be a proverb or phrase, to call the family of Owain Gwynedd Tylwyth John ab Maredudd, the race of John ab Maredudd."

 Morys (Morris) ap Sion ap Maredudd (died c.1511) = Angharad verch Elisau ap Gruffydd ab Einion
 Robert ap Morys o'r Parc (d.1576) = Lowry verch Lewis ab Ieuan ap Dafydd

From Robert ap Morys the family were known as the Anwyl of Parc Family, after their abode near Penrhyndeudraeth at this time.

 Lewis Anwyl (ap Robert) (1535–1605) = Elizabeth verch Morys ab Ieuan ap Sion ap Maredudd o Frynkyr
 William Lewis Anwyl of Park (c.1565 – 1642), magistrate, High Sheriff of Merionethshire 1611 and 1624 and High Sheriff of Caernarvonshire 1637 =  Elizabeth, eldest daughter and coheiress of Edward Herbert, of Maes Machre, Cemmaes, Wales.

Descent from William Lewis Annwill (died 1642) to Evan Vaughan Anwyl (born 1943)

Thomas Nicholas in 1872 said of him;

"William Lewis Anwyl, Esq., of Parc, Sheriff of Merioneth 1611, 1624, who married Elizabeth, daughter and co-heiress of Edward Herbert, Esquire, of Cemmaes, in Cyfeiliog, grandson of Sir Richard Herbert, Kt...By her he left a numerous offspring of 8 sons and 4 daughters." 

William Lewis Anwyl had eight sons (who survived to maturity), viz;

 Lewis (d. 1641 without male issue)
 Robert (died 1653 with issue. William Lewis Anwyl of Park (Robert's only grandson) was buried in Westminster Abbey 1701 and this line expires.)
 John (d. 1659 without male issue)
 Edward (died 1674 without male issue)
 William (d. 1694 with issue. His descendants in the male line continued until the death of Rice Owen Anwyl of Bala in 1879)
 Evan (died 1666 with issue. His descendants in the male line survive to the present day. His side of the family became the senior in 1831)
 Emmanuel (died 1646 without issue)
 Richard (died 1685 without male issue)

Descendants of William Anwyl (5)

 Lewis Anwyl (c.1640 – c.1700) = Anne, daughter of Hugh Owen, of Tynyfoel and had issue;
 William (Rev) Anwyl of Hendremur, Merioneth (1670–1729) educated St John's College Oxford (BA) = Jane, daughter and heiress of Thomas Lloyd, of Llandecwyn. In 1719 Sir John Wynn, 5th Baronet of Gwydir died without male issue. William had issue;
 Thomas Lloyd Anwyl of Hendremur (1695–1734); married Margaret, daughter of Thomas Meyrick, and died 1734.  He had issue;
 William Anwyl of Hendremur (1717–1751) = Margaret, daughter of Rice Pierce, of Celynyn. leaving issue:
 Rice (Rev) Anwyl (1740–1819) = Margaret, daughter of David Roberts, of Goppa, and died 1819 leaving:
 David Anwyl of Bala (1771–1831) = married Mary, daughter of Gruffyd Owen of Pencader.

Descendants of Evan Anwyl (6)

The present Anwyl of Tywyn Family descend from the sixth son, Evan (Ieuan), whose descendants became head of the family on the deaths of his brothers and their male issue.

 Evan (Ieuan) Anwyl of Brynkir, Caernarfonshire later Llugwy, Merionethshire (1610–1666) and = Catherine daughter of Maurice Williams. He was High Sheriff of Merionethshire in 1649 and again in 1664. He had issue;
 Maurice Anwyl of Llugwy (c.1645-c.1695) = Joane daughter of Hugh Pryce, of Penmaendyfi, Caernarfonshire.

Maurice Anwyl is recorded by Thomas Nicholas in Annals and antiquities of the counties and county families of Wales (1872);

"The ancient family of Anwyl have resided at Llugwy from the time when Maurice Anwyl (circa 1695) m. Joan, the heiress of that place, but previously for many ages at Parc, in the parish of Llanfrothen, in the same county of Merionethshire. There Lewys Dwnn, Deputy Herald, found them, in the 16th century, when pursuing his Heraldic Visitation of Wales; and there they had then been seated for several generations. Their lineage is from Owain Gwynedd, the illustrious Prince of North Wales (12th cent.), son of Prince Gruffudd ap Cynan, of the direct line (through the eldest son, Anarawd) of Rhodri Mawr, King, first of N. Wales, then of all Wales (9th cent.)."

Maurice had issue;

 Evan Anwyl of Llugwy (c.1680 – 1722) = Mallt. He had issue: two sons, Maurice (see below) and Evan (see Descendants of Evan (b.1718));
 Maurice Anwyl of Llugwy (c. 1717 – 1783) = Anne daughter of Hugh Evans, of Machynlleth, Montgomeryshire. Had issue two sons, Evan (son A) and Maurice (son B);
 Evan Anwyl of Llugwy (son A) (1745–1817) = Margaret Davies grand daughter of Jonathan Bunce, of Glanfread. Had issue one son;
 Jonathan Bunce Anwyl of Llugwy (1789–1852). He died unmarried and without issue and this line expires with him.

Descendants of Evan Anwyl (b.1718)

 Evan Anwyl (son of Evan Anwyl of Llugwy b.1680) of Bacheiddan, Montgomeryshire (1718–1811) = Margaret daughter of Evan Richard, of Penmaen, Glamorgan and had issue:
 Evan Anwyl of Hendre Seifion, Llanwrin, Montgomeryshire (1751–1818) = Jonet daughter of John Pughe, of Cedris, Tal-y-llyn, Merionethshire. Had issue;
 Evan Anwyl of Hendre Seifion (1792–1851) = Elinor daughter of Evan Watkin, of Matharvarn, Merionethshire. Had issue;
 Evan Anwyl of Gelli, Meifod, Montgomeryshire (1818–1897) = Ann daughter of Edward Jones, of Lawr-y-cal, Mallwyd. Had issue two sons, Evan (see below) and Jonathan;
 Evan Anwyl of Ty-Mawr, Tywyn, Merionethshire (1858–1955) = Sarah daughter of Jonathan Benbow of Meifod. Had issue;
 Evan Anwyl of Ty-Mawr, Tywyn, Merionethshire (1911–1968) = Gwyneth daughter of Harold Henry Scott of Chester. Had issue;
 Evan Vaughan Anwyl of Ty-Mawr, Tywyn, Merionethshire (1943-extant).

Evan Vaughan Anwyl of Ty-Mawr

Evan Vaughan Anwyl (born 9 December 1943) is the current head of the Anwyl of Tywyn Family whose male line ancestors are claimed to extend back to William Lewis Anwyl and beyond that to Owain Gwynedd and Rhodri Mawr.  He resides in Tywyn, Gwynedd, in north Wales, and speaks Welsh.

Evan Vaughan Anwyl was educated at Tywyn Grammar School and then the University of Wales Aberystwyth where he was awarded a BSc in 1967 and DipEd in 1968. He resides at Ty Mawr, Tywyn, Gwynedd, Wales.

He was interviewed by Byron Rogers for the book Three Journeys, an excerpt of which was published in Cambria Magazine in June 2011. Concerning his extraordinary heritage, Anwyl said,

"History was never a favourite subject of mine. We've always been humble farmers, that is until I and my two sisters became teachers. We've always been proud of our family history, but amongst ourselves, beyond that, no."

The coat of arms of this family are described (by Thomas Nicholas in 1872) as follows;

 Vert, three eagles displayed in fesse Or (Owain Gwynedd), a fleur-de-lis Or for difference 6th son (Rhodri ab Owain Gwynedd)
 Sable, a chevron between three fleurs-de-lis argent (Collwyn ap Tangno)
 Vert, a chevron between three wolves' heads erased argent (Rhirid Flaidd)
 Per pale azur and gules, three lions rampant argent (Herbert of Cemmaes)
 Argent, an eagle displayed with two necks sable (Meurig Llwyd of Llwyn y Maes)
 Argent a lion passant sable between three fleurs-de-lis gules (Einion ap Seissylt)

 Crest : An eagle displayed Or
 Motto: Eryr eryrod Eryri (English: "The eagle of the eagles of Snowdon.")

See also
Kings of Wales family trees

Footnotes

References

  - 

Welsh monarchs
Welsh royalty
Monarchs of Gwynedd
House of Aberffraw
Pretenders
Welsh families